The Smoky Hollow Historic District is a U.S. historic district (designated as such on October 27, 2000) located in Tallahassee, Florida. The district is bounded by East Lafayette Street, CSX RR tracks, Myers Park and Myers Park Lane. It contains 14 historic buildings and 3 structures.

On January 14, 2009, a decrease in the district's boundary was implemented.

References

External links
 Leon County listings at National Register of Historic Places

Neighborhoods in Tallahassee, Florida
National Register of Historic Places in Tallahassee, Florida
Historic districts on the National Register of Historic Places in Florida
Vernacular architecture in Florida